Duchess of Gordon is a title given to the wife of the Duke of Gordon. Women who have held the title include:

Henrietta Gordon, Duchess of Gordon (née Mordaunt, –1760), wife of Alexander Gordon, 2nd Duke of Gordon
Catherine Gordon, Duchess of Gordon (née Gordon, 1718–1779), wife of the 3rd Duke
Jane Gordon, Duchess of Gordon (née Maxwell, 1748/49–1812), wife of the 4th Duke
Elizabeth Gordon, Duchess of Gordon (née Brodie, 1794–1864) wife of the 5th Duke